Jakub Bednaruk (born 9 September 1976) is a Polish former professional volleyball player and coach.

Career as coach
In 2010, after ending his career as a player, he came back to AZS Politechnika Warszawska as an assistant coach. In 2012, he became the head coach of this club. In April 2017, he moved to Łuczniczka Bydgoszcz. In 2019, he became a head coach of MKS Będzin. He works as a volleyball commentator.

Honours

As a player
 National championships
 1998/1999  Polish Cup, with Czarni Radom
 2007/2008  Italian Championship, with Itas Diatec Trentino

References

External links
 
 
 Coach/Player profile at Volleybox.net

1976 births
Living people
Sportspeople from Bielsko-Biała
Polish men's volleyball players
Polish volleyball coaches
Volleyball coaches of international teams
Polish expatriate sportspeople in Italy
Expatriate volleyball players in Italy
BBTS Bielsko-Biała players
Czarni Radom players
Legia Warsaw (volleyball) players
Skra Bełchatów players
Projekt Warsaw players
Jastrzębski Węgiel players
Trefl Gdańsk players
Projekt Warsaw coaches
MKS Będzin coaches
Czarni Radom coaches
Setters (volleyball)